Zahari bin Sarip is a Malaysian politician. He has been the Member of Johor State Legislative Assembly for Buloh Kasap since May 2018 and currently serves as Johor State Executive Councillor since March 2022. He was also a Member of Dewan Negara from 2017 to 2020.

Election Results

Honours 
 :
  Knight Companion of the Order of the Crown of Pahang (D.I.M.P.) – Dato' (2015)

References 

Living people
People from Johor
Malaysian people of Malay descent
Malaysian Muslims
United Malays National Organisation politicians
21st-century Malaysian politicians
Members of the Johor State Legislative Assembly
Year of birth missing (living people)